Paliha (born 6 June 1996) is a Chinese freestyle wrestler. She won one of the bronze medals in the women's 72 kg event at the 2019 World Wrestling Championships held in Nur-Sultan, Kazakhstan.

Career 

She won the gold medal in the women's 75 kg event at the Asian Wrestling Championships both in 2017 and in 2019. In 2017, she also won the gold medal in the 75 kg event at the Asian Indoor and Martial Arts Games held in Ashgabat, Turkmenistan. She also competed in the women's freestyle 75 kg event at the 2017 World Wrestling Championships where she was eliminated in the semifinals by Vasilisa Marzaliuk.

She also won the gold medal in the women's 76 kg event at the 2018 World U23 Wrestling Championship held in Bucharest, Romania and at the 2019 World U23 Wrestling Championship held in Budapest, Hungary.

Achievements

References

External links 
 

Living people
1996 births
Place of birth missing (living people)
Chinese female sport wrestlers
World Wrestling Championships medalists
Asian Wrestling Championships medalists
21st-century Chinese women